Miguel Gabriel "Papín" Ortiz Veléz is a Puerto Rican politician, who served as mayor of Sabana Grande, from 1993 to 2018. Ortiz was affiliated with the Popular Democratic Party (PPD).

In 2018, U.S. Federal authorities accused Veléz of defrauding the government of millions of dollars in a scheme that lasted from 2013 to 2016.

References

Living people
Interamerican University of Puerto Rico alumni
Mayors of places in Puerto Rico
Popular Democratic Party (Puerto Rico) politicians
People from Sabana Grande, Puerto Rico
Prisoners and detainees of the United States federal government
Puerto Rico politicians convicted of crimes
Year of birth missing (living people)